Alex Gonzalez , better known as King Lil G, is an American rapper of Mexican descent from South Los Angeles, Los Angeles. He is best known for his 2014 single "Hopeless Boy". He released albums King Enemy, Ak47 Boyz, 90's Kid and Paint The City Blue.

"According to family lore", he is a descendant of the iconic Mexican revolutionary leader Emiliano Zapata.

Gonzalez decided to build his career independently despite receiving offers from all major labels. He maintains control over his career so that his focus on art and social awareness doesn't get watered down by the need to maximize profit. He claims that after rap he would like to direct his own films. He already directs his own music videos which are very popular and have over 500 million views on youtube.

He was influenced musically by the G-funk flavor of 90s West Coast rap about women, weed and palm trees, especially that of California hip-hop staples Tupac, Snoop Dogg, Dr. Dre, Eazy-E, Kid Frost, Mellow Man Ace, among others, as well as Mexican folk ballads called corridos music.

References

External links
 Biography about King Lil G on StreetFame.org

Living people
Chicano rap
American rappers of Mexican descent
Rappers from Los Angeles
Gangsta rappers
1986 births
21st-century American rappers
People from Inglewood, California
Mexican emigrants to the United States
West Coast hip hop musicians
Hispanic and Latino American rappers